Bøverdal Church is a parish church of the Church of Norway in Lom Municipality in Innlandet county, Norway. It is located in the village of Galdesanden. It is the church for the Bøverdal parish which is part of the Nord-Gudbrandsdal prosti (deanery) in the Diocese of Hamar. The brown, wooden church was built in an octagonal design in 1864 using plans drawn up by the architect Erik Pedersen Rusten. The church seats about 125 people.

History
The first church in Galdesanden was likely a wooden stave church that was built during the 14th century. That building was a farm chapel for the Bøverdalen valley. Probably during the 1500s, the church was destroyed by a large flood. The village was then without a church for several hundred years. It was not until the 1860s that a new church was built, designed by farmer Erik Pedersen Rusten, who was a driving force for church building for many years. The lead builder was Jakob Jonsen Storlien from Dovre. The foundation wall was begun in the autumn of 1862, and the church was consecrated on 22 August 1864. The new building is a timber-framed octagonal church.

Media gallery

See also
List of churches in Hamar

References

Lom, Norway
Churches in Innlandet
Octagonal churches in Norway
Wooden churches in Norway
19th-century Church of Norway church buildings
Churches completed in 1864
1864 establishments in Norway